Arepa is a type of food made of ground maize dough stuffed with a filling, eaten in the northern region of South America since pre-Columbian times, and notable primarily in the cuisines of Colombia and Venezuela, but also present in the cuisines of Bolivia, Panama and other countries.

It is commonly eaten in those countries and can be served with accompaniments such as cheese, cuajada (fresh cheese), various types of meat, chicken, avocado, or diablito (deviled ham spread). It can also be split to make sandwiches. Sizes, maize types, and added ingredients vary its preparation. It is similar to the Mexican gordita, the Salvadoran pupusa, the Ecuadorian tortilla de maíz and the Panamanian tortilla or changa.

Origins 
The arepa is a pre-Columbian dish from the area that is now Colombia, Panama and Venezuela. Instruments used to make flour for the arepas, and the clay slabs on which they were cooked, were often found at archaeological sites in the area. Although it has not been specified in which country an arepa was cooked for the first time, it has been possible to define the oldest dates of the presence of maize in Colombia and Venezuela. For example, in Colombia, the first record of the existence of corn dates from about 3,000 years ago, while in Venezuela, the estimate is about 2,800 years ago.

Throughout its history, the arepa has stayed mainly unchanged from the arepas that pre-Columbian native peoples would have consumed, making the arepa one of the few pre-contact traditions that have remained popular in the years since colonization. The name arepa is said to be derived from erepa, the word for cornbread in the Cumanagoto language.

Characteristics 

The arepa is a flat, round, unleavened patty of soaked, ground kernels of maize, or—more frequently nowadays—maize meal or maize flour.  It can be grilled, baked, fried, boiled, or steamed. The characteristics vary by color, flavor, size, and the food with which it may be stuffed, depending on the region. Simple arepas are filled with butter or cheese and baked. Depending on the meal, more filling varieties can be added with combinations of ingredients like beans, meat, avocados, eggs, tomatoes, salad, shrimp, or fish. Fried arepas are often consumed in northern South America, filled with white cheese on top and served with fried eggs. Sweet fried arepas are another variety often prepared with sugarloaf (papelón) and anise (anís). Venezuelan white cheese is another topping for fried arepas that can be combined with feta cheese.

Production 
Initially, arepa flour was made by grinding maize at home. The flour is mixed with water and salt, and occasionally oil, butter, eggs, and/or milk. Because the flour is already cooked, the blend forms into patties easily. After being kneaded and formed, the patties are fried, grilled, or baked. Some varieties of arepas are made with "peeled" corn using the nixtamalization process; they are known as arepa pelada.

Arepa flour is specially prepared (cooked in water, then dried) for making arepas and other maize dough-based dishes, such as hallacas, bollos, tamales, empanadas, atole and chicha. The flour may be called masarepa, masa de arepa, masa al instante, or harina precocida. The most popular brand names of maize flour are Harina PAN and Harina Juana in Venezuela, Areparina in Colombia, and Goya elsewhere.

Regional varieties

Bolivia 
Bolivian arepas are made from corn. There are different ways to prepare arepas, but one of the most traditional is the Cotoca recipe.  Several varieties of arepa can be found in the country, such as the Cruceña and Andina ones.

Colombia 

The arepa is an iconic food in Colombia, with some 75 distinct preparation forms. According to a study conducted by the Colombian Academy of Gastronomy, the arepa is part of the Colombian cultural heritage and can be considered a symbol of national gastronomic unity."

In 2006, the arepa was named the cultural symbol of Colombia in a competition organized by Semana magazine with support from Caracol Televisión, the Ministry of Culture and 'Colombia is Passion'.

In the Paisa region, the arepa is especially important to the local people and sometimes accompanies all meals of the day. In addition, arepas are strung into necklaces and placed around the necks of honored dignitaries as a sign of praise.

In Colombia, the arepa is sold commercially in neighborhood stores, chain supermarkets, and market plazas and packaged with preservatives as a pre-molded white or yellow corn dough ready to grill or fry at home. It is also sold in the form of industrialized corn flour that requires hydration before preparation. In addition, arepas are sold by street vendors, in cafeterias, and in neighborhood stores. Restaurants of the Paisa Region offer a wide variety of arepas, including a unique style of stuffed arepa that can be filled with eggs, meat, or cheese. Colombians in the Caribbean region commonly eat a breakfast variation called arepa con huevo, which consists of a cooked arepa which has been split open, stuffed with a raw egg, and fried.

The Colombian Arepa Festival is celebrated in Barranquilla, Bogotá, Bucaramanga, Cali and Medellín. Each city takes turns organizing the festival between August and December.

Variations by region 
According to the Santa Marta City newspaper, El Informador, there are about 75 types of arepas around Colombia, among them is the arepa ocañera, consumed in the Department of Norte de Santander, characterized by the addition of queso costeño and other types of meat. Some recipes for this type of arepa can contain doble crema cheese and chicken. One of its characteristics is that it is relatively thin unlike other arepas and also has a toasted and golden colored shell.

Another variation is the arepa boyacense, with the Municipality of Ventaquemada being one of the most outstanding in terms of its production. this type of arepa may contain butter, eggs, and cheese. It has a certain sweetness, and in some recipes, this arepa may have cuajada.

There is also the arepa paisa, which is consumed in the Department of Antioquia. It is prepared with maíz trillado. It is the one that most closely resembles the indigenous cooking.

In addition, another arepa variation consumed in the Andean region of the country is the arepa santandereana, which contains cooked yuca and chicharrón.

Costa Rica 
In the Province of Guanacaste, arepas are prepared in the form of large, toasted sponge cakes, seasoned with Bagaces type cheese. In Cartago, during colonial times, arepas were filled with pork.

Puerto Rico 
In Puerto Rico, mainly in the San Juan area and beach sides, arepas are popular. They can also be found in some restaurants, almost always, arepas de coco. The Puerto Rican arepa is made with corn flour, coconut milk, coconut oil, baking powder, and sugar. They can be fried, baked, or cooked on a grill. Once done, the arepa is cut open and stuffed. There are countless fillings. Crab, shrimp, and octopus stewed in sofrito, lemon, coconut milk, and ginger, among other ingredients, are the most popular.

Spain 

Arepas are present in the Canary Islands due to population flow between the islands and Venezuela. They are found in the province of Santa Cruz de Tenerife and rarely in the archipelago's eastern islands. Many of the arepas consumed in the bars and restaurants of the islands are fried. Some incorporate ingredients from the local gastronomy such as soft cheese or Canary plantain.

Venezuela 

The arepa is a symbol of Venezuelan gastronomy and one of the most common pre-Hispanic foods still popular in Venezuela.

According to a 2015 survey of the Venezuelan people, nearly 70 percent of the nation ate arepas regularly. It is common for Venezuelans to eat arepas throughout the day, both as snacks and as sides to meals, creating a culture where these corn products can be found almost everywhere and in specific restaurants called "areperas". The arepa is seen as a cornerstone of a Venezuelan diet; previous to the 2015 food shortages, it was estimated that each year the average Venezuelan consumed about 30 kilos of the corn flour used to make arepas. Venezuelan arepas are commonly filled with a great variety of different fillings, from beef and avocado to cheese, varying widely by the location of where they are sold and the ingredients that can be obtained.

In Venezuela's Andes region, arepas de trigo are made with wheat flour rather than cornmeal. These lighter arepas are generally eaten as a snack or an accompaniment to heavier meals.

See also 

Cachapa
Gordita
Pupusa
 List of breads
 List of maize dishes

References

Further reading 

 Food and Agricultural Organization, United Nations. Maize in Human Nutrition
 Dr. Nelson Solorzano, a specialist in food and nutrition and Caribbean Region Culture. Socio-economic Development Planner specializing in Latin American Socio-economic Development History, Agriculture, and Culture. (CENDES-UCV), USA, May 2007.
 De los timoto-cuicas a la invisibilidad del indígena andino y a su diversidad cultural.
 Mariano Picón Salas. Pequeña Historia de la Arepa. Suma de Venezuela. Caracas, 1966.

Bolivian cuisine
Canary Islands cuisine
Colombian cuisine
Costa Rican cuisine
Maize dishes
Panamanian cuisine
Puerto Rican cuisine
Street food
Tortilla-based dishes
Venezuelan cuisine